Rhododendron is a genus of flowering plants in the family Ericaceae.

Rhododendron may also refer to:

 MV Rhododendron, a Washington State ferry
 Rhododendron, Oregon, United States
 Rhododendron Species Foundation and Botanical Garden, Federal Way, Washington
 Rhododendron State Park, a state park in Fitzwilliam, New Hampshire
 Rhododendron (horse) (born 2014), Thoroughbred racehorse

See also

 Rhododendron County Park
 Rhododendron Creek